National Sports Academy can refer to:

 National Sports Academy "Vasil Levski"
 National Sports Academy (Lake Placid, New York)